This article contains a list of extinct species from the class Arachnida, with the year and location that they were last recorded.

Extinct

Extinct in the wild
There are currently no known arachnids that are extinct in the wild yet still kept in captivity.

See also
 Endangered spiders

References

Arachnids
Extinct arachnids
IUCN Red List extinct species
Extinct